= G-PASS Companies =

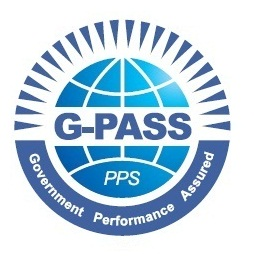

G-PASS (Government Performance ASSured) Companies refer to companies acknowledged of their technical skills and reliability by PPS KOREA through domestic government procurement, possessing potential for competitive export in foreign nations. They professionally manufacture products necessary in government procurements. As of May. 2022, there were 1050 companies selected.
